Parčić is a small village located in the region called Bukovica, 14 km northwest of Kistanje, in the continental part of Šibenik-Knin County, Croatia.

In the village there is a church from the 13th century.

References

Populated places in Šibenik-Knin County